Cobra Golf is a sports equipment manufacturing company based in Carlsbad, California, focused on golf equipment, producing a wide range of golf clubs. The company is currently a subsidiary of Puma.

History

Origin 
The company was founded in 1973 by Thomas L. Crow, winner of the 1961 Australian amateur golf championship. He was inspired by the notion that golfers in the United States typically bought clubs at a whim, with the hopes that they may make their game better. Cobra produced one of the first utility clubs, the "Baffler" –introduced in 1980– long before the use of such clubs became popular. Cobra was dedicated to the average golfer, especially ladies and seniors which makes it understandable that is also the first U.S. club manufacturer to sell stock graphite-shafted woods and irons that are known for being lighter clubs. In five years, Cobra Golf was selling about $4.5 million worth of these clubs annually.

In 1994 King Cobra oversized irons became the best selling irons in golf, making Cobra synonymous with oversized irons. The company was acquired in 1996 by American Brands Inc. (later known as Fortune Brands) and was grouped together under the Acushnet Company umbrella. In 2010, Cobra was acquired by Puma SE.

In 1999 Cobra introduced Dista golf balls intended to maximize distance for all players with multiple swing speed models offered.  "[In 2005] Cobra drivers rank No. 1 in Overall Driver Satisfaction Ratings in both 2003 and 2004, according to Darrell Survey U.S. Consumer Research, a leading independent golf consumer research company."  Cobra continues to make advancements in their clubs and golf balls, and their sponsored tour players continue to thrive using these new products.

Marketing
Between 1989 and 1993, the company grew from $20 million to $56 million in annual sales thanks to aggressive marketing that included endorsements from golfing greats Hale Irwin, Beth Daniel and Greg Norman. Cobra had a successful relationship with former world number one Greg Norman. Since 2009, the most well known face of Cobra Puma golf clubs and apparel is Rickie Fowler, most known for his bright orange shirt color.

Puma acquisition 
German company Puma acquired all of Cobra from the Acushnet Company in 2010, fitting golfers with clothing, shoes and equipment for the sport.

In February 2014, Cobra Golf signed a multi-year partnership with the PGA Tour's Honda Classic, making it one of the lead sponsors of the event.

In 2016 Cobra Golf partnered with Flying Tee, and will provide the official equipment and apparel. Flying Tee provides a fun golfing environment similar to the well known Topgolf, but they also provide simulated course play.

In 2019 Cobra was named by Golf Digest the best game improvement iron. In November that year, five-time PGA TOUR winner Jason Dufner, signed a multi-year partnership with Cobra before playing in the 2019 Mayakoba Golf Classic. In November 2020, Cobra Golf launched a 3D-printed putter.

Products 
Cobra markets a full range of golf clubs including; drivers, fairways, hybrids, irons, wedges, utility irons, etc.

Sponsorships 
Cobra has maintained endorsement deals with many professional golfers playing on the leading tours, including Rickie Fowler, Gary Woodland and Lexi Thompson.

References

External links
 

Golf equipment manufacturers
Golf in the United States
Companies based in Carlsbad, California
Manufacturing companies established in 1973
Sporting goods manufacturers of the United States
Puma (brand)
1973 establishments in California
2010 mergers and acquisitions